The Mahananda River is a trans-boundary river that flows through the Indian states of Bihar and West Bengal, and Bangladesh. It is an important tributary of the Ganges.

Course

The Mahananda river system consists of two streams- one is locally known as Fulahar river and the other Mahananda. Fulahar originates from mountainous region of Himalayas in Nepal and traverses through the Indian state of Bihar and merges with Ganges in left opposite to Rajmahal. It flows through Mahananda Wildlife Sanctuary and descends to the plains near Siliguri. It touches Jalpaiguri district.

It enters Bangladesh near Tentulia in Panchagarh District, flows for  after Tentulia and returns to India. After flowing through Uttar Dinajpur district in West Bengal and Kishanganj, Purnia and Katihar districts in Bihar, it enters Malda district in West Bengal. The Mahananda divides the district into two regions — the eastern region, consisting mainly of old alluvial and relatively infertile soil is commonly known as Barind (Borendrovomee), and the western region, which is further subdivided by the river Kalindri into two areas, the northern area is known as "Tal". It is low-lying and vulnerable to inundation during rainy season; the southern area consists of very fertile land and is thickly populated, being commonly known as "Diara".

It joins the Ganges at Godagiri in Nawabganj district in Bangladesh.

Basin data

Tributaries
The main tributaries of the Mahananda are Balason, Mechi, Kankai and River Kalindri. At the East of the confluence of the Kalindri and the Mahananda lies the Old Malda town. In the Siliguri area it has three tributaries called the Trinai, Ranochondi and the pair of Chokor and Dauk taken as a single tributary.

References

External links
 

Siliguri
Rivers of Bangladesh
Rivers of Bihar
Rivers of West Bengal
International rivers of Asia
Rivers of India
Rivers of Rangpur Division